France competed at the 2016 Summer Olympics in Rio de Janeiro, Brazil, from 5 to 21 August 2016. French athletes had appeared in every Summer Olympic Games of the modern era, alongside Australia, Great Britain, and Greece. The French Olympic Committee sent its largest ever delegation in Olympic history outside of when it was the host nation, with a total of 401 athletes, 232 men and 169 women, competing in all sports, except field hockey.

Medallists

|  style="text-align:left; width:78%; vertical-align:top;"|

|  style="text-align:left; width:22%; vertical-align:top;"|

* – Indicates the athlete competed in preliminaries but not the final

Multiple medallists

The following competitors won several medals at the 2016 Summer Olympics.

Competitors

|  style="text-align:left; width:78%; vertical-align:top;"|
The following is the list of number of competitors participating in the Games. Note that reserves in fencing, field hockey, football, and handball are not counted as athletes:

Archery

Three French archers qualified for the men's events by virtue of the nation's podium finish in the team recurve competition at the 2016 Archery World Cup meet in Antalya, Turkey.

Athletics

French athletes have so far achieved qualifying standards in the following athletics events (up to a maximum of 3 athletes in each event):

On 25 April 2016, marathon runner Christelle Daunay and race walkers Yohann Diniz and Kévin Campion became the first French athletes to be selected to the Olympic team. Decathlete Kévin Mayer and women's  racewalker Émilie Menuet were named as part of the second batch of nominated athletes to the Olympic roster on 7 June 2016.

A total of 22 athletes (11 per gender) were added to the track and field team for the Games, based on their performances achieved at the French Championships & Olympic Trials ( 24 to 26 June) in Angers, with Mélina Robert-Michon throwing the discus at her fifth straight Games, Kafétien Gomis returning for his second Olympics in the long jump after a 12-year absence, and pole vaulter Renaud Lavillenie aiming to defend his Olympic pole vault title. Other athletes also featured Christophe Lemaitre, middle-distance runner Pierre-Ambroise Bosse, steeplechaser and double Olympic silver medalist Mahiedine Mekhissi-Benabbad, and 2015 Worlds bronze medalist Alexandra Tavernier (women's hammer throw). Twenty-seven more athletes rounded out the French roster at the end of the qualifying period, extending its size to a total of 54.

Track & road events
Men

Women

Field events

Women

Combined events – Men's decathlon

Combined events – Women's heptathlon

Badminton

France has qualified two badminton players for each of the following events into the Olympic tournament. London 2012 Olympian Brice Leverdez and Delphine Lansac were selected among the top 34 individual shuttlers each in the men's and women's singles based on the BWF World Rankings as of 5 May 2016.

Basketball

Men's tournament

France men's basketball team qualified for the Olympics by securing its lone outright berth and winning the final match over Canada at the Manila leg of the 2016 FIBA World Qualifying Tournament.

Team roster

Group play

Quarterfinal

Women's tournament

France women's basketball team qualified for the Olympics with a quarterfinal victory at the 2016 FIBA World Olympic Qualifying Tournament in Nantes.

Team roster

Group play

Quarterfinal

Semifinal

Bronze medal match

Boxing

France has entered ten boxers (eight men and two women) to compete in the following weight classes into the Olympic boxing tournament. Mathieu Bauderlique was the only Frenchman finishing among the top two of their respective division in the AIBA Pro Boxing series, while 2012 Olympian Tony Yoka earned a lone outright Olympic berth in the super heavyweight bout at the 2015 World Championships. Three more boxers (Oumiha, Assomo, and Biongolo) had claimed their Olympic spots at the 2016 European Qualification Tournament in Samsun, Turkey.

Sarah Ourahmoune and Estelle Mossely were confirmed as France's first ever female Olympic boxers with a quarterfinal victory each in women's flyweight and lightweight division, respectively, at the World Championships in Astana, Kazakhstan. Meanwhile, Souleymane Cissokho, Elie Konki, and Hassan Amzile secured additional Olympic places on the French roster at the 2016 AIBA World Qualifying Tournament in Baku, Azerbaijan.

Men

Women

Canoeing

Slalom
French canoeists have qualified a maximum of one boat in each of the following classes through the 2015 ICF Canoe Slalom World Championships. The roster of French slalom canoeists, led by London 2012 Olympians Gauthier Klauss and Matthieu Péché, was announced on 10 April 2016 as a result of their top performances at the Olympic Trials in Pau.

Sprint
French canoeists have qualified one boat in each of the following events through the 2015 ICF Canoe Sprint World Championships. The sprint canoeing team was named as part of the second batch of nominated athletes to the Olympic roster on 7 June 2016.

Men

Women

Qualification Legend: FA = Qualify to final (medal); FB = Qualify to final B (non-medal)

Cycling

Road
French riders qualified for the following quota places in the men's and women's Olympic road race by virtue of their top 15 final national ranking in the 2015 UCI World Tour (for men) and top 22 in the UCI World Ranking (for women). The women's road cycling team (Cordon & Ferrand-Prévot) was named as part of the second batch of nominated athletes to the Olympic roster on 7 June 2016, with four male cyclists (Alaphilippe, Bardet, Barguil, & Pinot, later remplaced by Vuillermoz) joining them on 13 July.

Men

Women

Track
Following the completion of the 2016 UCI Track Cycling World Championships, French riders accumulated spots in both men's and women's team sprint, as well as the men's and women's omnium. As a result of their place in the men's and women's team sprint, France has won the right to enter two riders in both men's and women's sprint and men's and women's keirin.

The French Cycling Federation announced the track cycling squad for the Olympics on 5 April 2016, including 2012 double silver medalist Grégory Baugé in the men's sprint.

Sprint

Team sprint

Qualification legend: FA=Gold medal final; FB=Bronze medal final

Keirin

Omnium

Mountain biking
French mountain bikers qualified for three men's and two women's quota places into the Olympic cross-country race, as a result of the nation's second-place finish for men and fourth for women, respectively, in the UCI Olympic Ranking List of 25 May 2016. The mountain biking team was named as part of the second batch of nominated athletes to the Olympic roster on 7 June 2016, with double Olympic champion Julien Absalon remarkably going to his fourth Games.

BMX
French riders qualified for three men's and one women's quota place in BMX at the Olympics, as a result of the nation's fourth-place finish for men and fifth for women in the UCI Olympic Ranking List of 31 May 2016. The BMX riders, led by London 2012 Olympian Joris Daudet, were named as part of the second batch of nominated athletes to the Olympic roster on 7 June 2016.

Diving

French divers qualified for the following individual and synchronized team spots at the 2016 Summer Olympics through the World Championships and the FINA World Cup series. The diving squad was selected as part of the first batch of nominated athletes to the Olympic roster on 27 April 2016.

Equestrian

French equestrians have qualified a full squad in the team dressage, eventing and jumping competitions through the 2014 FEI World Equestrian Games, the 2015 European Dressage Championships, and the 2015 European Eventing Championships.

Dressage

Eventing

"#" indicates that the score of this rider does not count in the team competition, since only the best three results of a team are counted.

Jumping

"#" indicates that the score of this rider does not count in the team competition, since only the best three results of a team are counted.

Fencing

French fencers have qualified a full squad each in the men's team foil, men's team épée, and women's team sabre by virtue of their top 4 national finish in the FIE Olympic Team Rankings, while the women's épée team picked up a spare berth freed by Africa for being the next highest ranking team. Sabre fencer Vincent Anstett, along with 2012 Olympic foilists Astrid Guyart and Ysaora Thibus had claimed their spots on the French team by finishing among the top 14 in the FIE Adjusted Official Rankings.

The men's foil fencers (Cadot, Le Pechoux, & Lefort), along with the épée teams (both men and women), were named to the Olympic roster on 26 May 2016. The women's sabre team rounded out the fencing selection on 2 June 2016.

The fencing team was officially named as part of the second batch of nominated athletes to the Olympic roster on 7 June 2016.

Men

Women

Football

Women's tournament

France's women's football team qualified for the Olympics by reaching the top three for European teams at the 2015 FIFA Women's World Cup in Canada.

Team roster

Group play

Quarterfinal

Golf 

France has entered four golfers (two per gender) into the Olympic tournament. Grégory Bourdy (world no. 112), Julien Quesne (world no. 123), Karine Icher (world no. 60), and Gwladys Nocera (world no. 134) qualified directly among the top 60 players for their respective individual events based on the IGF World Rankings as of 11 July 2016.

Gymnastics

Artistic
France has fielded a full squad of ten gymnasts (five men and five women) into the Olympic competition. Both men's and women's squads had claimed one of the remaining four spots each in the team all-around at the Olympic Test Event in Rio de Janeiro. The French Olympic Committee named the men's and women's artistic gymnastics teams on 27 June 2016.

Men
Team

Individual finals

Women
Team

Individual finals

Rhythmic 
France has qualified one rhythmic gymnast for the individual all-around by finishing in the top 15 at the 2015 World Championships in Stuttgart, Germany.

Trampoline
France has qualified one gymnast in the men's trampoline by virtue of a top eight finish at the 2015 World Championships in Odense, Denmark. Meanwhile, a spare Olympic berth freed by the Tripartite Commission had been awarded to the French female gymnast, as the next highest from the eligible NOC on the individual ranking list at the 2016 Olympic Test Event in Rio de Janeiro. The French Olympic Committee had selected Sébastien Martiny and Marine Jurbert to compete in both men's and women's trampoline, respectively, at the Games.

Handball

Summary

Men's tournament

The French men's handball team qualified for the Olympics by winning the 2015 World Championships.

Team roster

Group play

Quarterfinal

Semifinal

Gold medal match

Women's tournament

The French women's handball team qualified for the Olympics by virtue of a top two finish at the first meet of the Olympic Qualification Tournament in Metz.

Team roster

Group play

Quarterfinal

Semifinal

Gold medal match

Judo

France has qualified a full squad of 14 judokas (seven men and seven women) for each of the following weight classes at the Games by virtue of their top 22 national finish for men and top 14 for women in the IJF World Ranking List of 30 May 2016. The judo team was named to the Olympic roster on 1 June 2016, including defending Olympic heavyweight champion Teddy Riner, and London 2012 bronze medalists Priscilla Gneto, Automne Pavia, Gévrise Émane, and Audrey Tcheuméo.

Men

Women

Modern pentathlon

French athletes have qualified for the following spots to compete in modern pentathlon. Valentin Prades, Valentin Belaud, and Élodie Clouvel secured a selection each in the men's and women's event through the 2015 European Championships.

Rowing

France has qualified a total of seven boats for each of the following rowing classes into the Olympic regatta. Six rowing crews had confirmed Olympic places for their boats at the 2015 FISA World Championships in Lac d'Aiguebelette, France, while the men's four rowers were further added to the French roster with their top two finish at the 2016 European & Final Qualification Regatta in Lucerne, Switzerland.

On 28 June 2016, a total of 18 rowers (14 men and 4 women) were selected to the French team for the Games, including London 2012 silver medalists Germain Chardin and Dorian Mortelette in the men's coxless pair.

Men

Women

Qualification Legend: FA=Final A (medal); FB=Final B (non-medal); FC=Final C (non-medal); FD=Final D (non-medal); FE=Final E (non-medal); FF=Final F (non-medal); SA/B=Semifinals A/B; SC/D=Semifinals C/D; SE/F=Semifinals E/F; QF=Quarterfinals; R=Repechage

Rugby sevens

Men's tournament

France's men's rugby sevens team qualified for the Olympics by winning the 2015 Rugby Europe Sevens Championships.

Team roster

Group play

Quarterfinal

Classification semifinal (5–8)

Seventh place match

Women's tournament

France's women's rugby sevens team qualified for the Olympics by winning the 2015 Rugby Europe Sevens Championships.

Team roster

Group play

Quarterfinal

Classification semifinal (5–8)

Fifth place match

Sailing

France has qualified one boat for each of the following classes at the 2014 ISAF Sailing World Championships, bringing the maximum quota of 15 sailors, in ten boats.

On 2 December 2015, the French Sailing Federation had selected the first five sailors to compete at the Rio regatta, including Olympic silver medalist Jonathan Lobert in the Finn class. The rest of the French sailing fleet were named to the Olympic team through a series of selection meets in February 2016; among them featured two-time Olympic Laser sailor Jean-Baptiste Bernaz, and four-time World mixed multihull champions Billy Besson and Marie Riou.

Men

Women

Mixed

M = Medal race; EL = Eliminated – did not advance into the medal race

Shooting

French shooters have achieved quota places for the following events by virtue of their best finishes at the 2014 ISSF World Shooting Championships, the 2015 ISSF World Cup series, and European Championships or Games, as long as they obtained a minimum qualifying score (MQS) by 31 March 2016.

The entire shooting squad, led by Olympic bronze medalists Anthony Terras (2008) and Céline Goberville (2012), was announced as part of the initial batch to the  Olympic team selection on 25 April 2016.

Men

Women

Qualification Legend: Q = Qualify for the next round; q = Qualify for the bronze medal (shotgun)

Swimming

French swimmers have so far achieved qualifying standards in the following events (up to a maximum of 2 swimmers in each event at the Olympic Qualifying Time (OQT), and potentially 1 at the Olympic Selection Time (OST)): Swimmers must attain the federation's entry standards in finals at the 2016 French Elite Championships in Montpellier (29 March to 3 April) to assure their selection to the Olympic team.

On 6 April 2016, the French Swimming Federation (FFN) had announced the entire roster of 30 swimmers (17 men and 13 women) to compete at the Games, featuring London 2012 Olympic champions Florent Manaudou and Yannick Agnel.

Men

Women

Synchronized swimming

France has fielded a squad of two synchronized swimmers to compete only in the women's duet by virtue of their first-place finish at the FINA Olympic test event in Rio de Janeiro.

Table tennis

France has entered four athletes into the table tennis competition at the Games. Emmanuel Lebesson secured one of the remaining Olympic spots in the men's singles by winning the repechage group final at the European Qualification Tournament in Halmstad, Sweden.

Simon Gauzy and London 2012 Olympian Li Xue were automatically selected among the top 22 eligible players each in their respective singles events, while Carole Grundisch granted an invitation from ITTF to compete in the women's singles as one of the next seven highest-ranked eligible players, not yet qualified, on the Olympic Ranking List.

Tristan Flore was awarded the third spot to build the men's team for the Games by virtue of a top 10 national finish in the ITTF Olympic Rankings.

On 28 July 2016, Grundisch withdrew from the Games due to her elbow injury sustained in a cycling accident.

Taekwondo

France entered four athletes into the taekwondo competition at the Olympics. M'Bar N'Diaye, Yasmina Aziez, Haby Niaré, and 2008 Olympic bronze medalist Gwladys Épangue qualified automatically for their respective weight classes by finishing in the top 6 WTF Olympic rankings.

Tennis

France has entered nine tennis players (six men and three women) into the Olympic tournament. Richard Gasquet (world no. 10), Jo-Wilfried Tsonga (world no. 12), Gaël Monfils (world no. 15), and Gilles Simon (world no. 18) qualified directly for the men's singles as four of the top 56 eligible players in the ATP World Rankings, while Alizé Cornet (world no. 59), Caroline Garcia (world no. 38), and Kristina Mladenovic (world no. 32) did so for the women's singles based on their WTA World Rankings as of 6 June 2016.

Pierre-Hugues Herbert and Nicolas Mahut had their appeals approved by the International Tennis Federation to compete in the men's doubles based on their direct top-10 ATP ranking.

On 18 July 2016, Gasquet pulled out of the Games due to a back injury and was replaced by Benoît Paire (world no. 24), the next eligible player from France.

Men

Women

Mixed

Triathlon

France has qualified a total of five triathletes for the Olympics. London 2012 Olympian Vincent Luis secured the men's triathlon spot with a top three finish at the ITU World Qualification Event in Rio de Janeiro. Meanwhile, rookies Dorian Coninx and Pierre Le Corre, along with Cassandre Beaugrand, were ranked among the top 40 eligible triathletes each in the men's and women's event, respectively, based on the ITU Olympic Qualification List as of 15 May 2016. Audrey Merle rounded out the French triathlon roster as a replacement for Emmie Charayron, who announced her withdrawal from the Games for medical reasons on 5 July 2016.

Volleyball

Indoor

Men's tournament

France men's volleyball team qualified for the Olympics by virtue of a top three national finish at the first meet of the World Olympic Qualifying Tournament in Tokyo, Japan, signifying the nation's Olympic comeback to the sport for the first time since 2004.

Team roster

Group play

Water polo

Summary

Men's tournament

France men's water polo team qualified for the Olympics by virtue of a top four finish at the Olympic Qualification Tournament in Trieste, signifying the nation's Olympic comeback to the sport for the first time since 1992.

Team roster

Group play

Weightlifting

French weightlifters have qualified three men's quota places for the Rio Olympics based on their combined team standing by points at the 2014 and 2015 IWF World Championships. A single women's Olympic spot had been added to the French roster by virtue of a top six national finish at the 2016 European Championships. The team must allocate these places to individual athletes by 20 June 2016.

The weightlifting team was named as part of the second batch of nominated athletes to the Olympic roster on 7 June 2016, with Benjamin Hennequin going to his third straight Olympics. Meanwhile, Kévin Bouly was added to the French weightlifting roster on 24 June 2016, following the omission of several weightlifters from the rankings list at the World Championships and their failure on the doping tests.

Wrestling

France has qualified two wrestlers for each the following weight classes into the Olympic competition. One of them finished among the top six to book an Olympic spot in the men's freestyle 74 kg at the 2015 World Championships, while the other had claimed the remaining slot in the women's freestyle 75 kg to round out the French roster at the initial meet of the World Qualification Tournament in Ulaanbaatar.

Men's freestyle

Women's freestyle

See also
France at the 2016 Summer Paralympics

References

External links 

 

Olympics
2016
Nations at the 2016 Summer Olympics